Essandoh is a surname. Notable people with the surname include: 

Ato Essandoh (born 1972), American actor
Roy Essandoh (born 1976), Northern Ireland footballer